The 1971 World Table Tennis Championships mixed doubles was the 31st edition of the mixed doubles championship.  

Zhang Xielin and Lin Huiqing defeated Antun Stipančić and Maria Alexandru in the final by three sets to one.

Results

See also
List of World Table Tennis Championships medalists

References

-